Livingston S.p.A.  was an Italian airline with its head office in Cardano al Campo, Varese and its main base at Milan Malpensa Airport.

History 
The airline was established on 13 January 2003 as a successor of Lauda Air Italy and started operations in May 2003.

On 9 October 2010, Livingston announced that flights were to be temporarily suspended after ENAC (Italian Civil Aviation Authority) suspended its licence. The full effect of the suspension took place from midnight 14 October 2010. The airline never resumed operations.

Destinations 

As of October 2008, Livingston operated scheduled and charter services connecting major Italian cities to holiday destinations in the Caribbean, Central America and South America, the Indian Ocean, Africa, the Mediterranean and the Middle East.

Fleet 
The Livingston fleet consisted of the following aircraft during its existence:

References

External links

Official website

Italian companies established in 2003
Italian companies disestablished in 2010
Defunct airlines of Italy
Airlines established in 2003
Airlines disestablished in 2010